Afumați may refer to several places in Romania:

 Afumați, Dolj, a commune in Dolj County
 Afumați, Ilfov, a commune in Ilfov County
 CS Afumați, an association football club based in Afumați, Ilfov
 Afumați, a village in Leleasca Commune, Olt County